The Navigation and Bombing System, or NBS,  was a navigation system used in the Royal Air Force's V-bomber fleet. Primary among its parts was the Navigation and Bombing Computer (NBC), a complex electro mechanical computer that combined the functions of dead reckoning navigation calculation with a bombsight calculator to provide outputs that guided the aircraft and automatically dropped the bombs with accuracy on the order of a few hundred metres on missions over thousands of kilometres.

Inputs to the NBS system included late models of the H2S radar, the True Airspeed Unit, a gyrocompass and the Green Satin radar. A Mk 6 radar altimeter was used for accurate height measurement but was not connected to the NBC. These inputs were used to set the Ground Speed Unit, which carried out the navigation calculations, which in turn fed the autopilot system. The NBC did not feed the T4 bombsight computer for visual sighting.

References
 

Mechanical computers
Aerial bombing